Kristian Reichel (born 11 June 1998) is a Czech professional ice hockey forward who currently plays for the Manitoba Moose in the American Hockey League (AHL) as a prospect to the Winnipeg Jets in the National Hockey League (NHL).

Playing career
Reichel played as a youth within HC Litvínov organization. He made his professional debut in the 2015–16 season with Litvínov in the Czech Extraliga (ELH). He was selected 27th overall in the 2017 CHL Import Draft by the Red Deer Rebels of the Western Hockey League (WHL).

In his only season of major junior with the Rebels in 2017–18, Reichel placed third in team scoring with 57 points through 63 regular season games. As an undrafted free agent, Reichel was signed to a one-year AHL contract with the Manitoba Moose, primary affiliate to the Winnipeg Jets, on 3 July 2018.

Making his North American professional debut in the 2018–19 season, Reichel registered 2 goals and 10 points in 55 games for the Moose.

Following a second full year with the Moose, posting 12 goals and 17 points through 37 regular season games, Reichel was signed by NHL affiliate, the Winnipeg Jets, to a two-year, entry-level contract on 16 June 2020.

International play
Reichel first represented the Czech Republic at the 2015 Ivan Hlinka Memorial Tournament.

Reichel made two appearances at the World Junior Championships, going scoreless in the 2017 World Junior Championships before collecting 3 goals and 4 points in 7 games at the following 2018 World Junior Championships in Buffalo, New York, en route to a fourth-place finish at the tournament.

Personal
Kristian's father is Robert Reichel, Olympic winner and Czech Ice Hockey Hall of Fame inductee. His uncle, Martin Reichel also played professionally in Europe along with his cousin, Thomas Reichel. His other cousin Lukas Reichel, also plays professionally.

Career statistics

Regular season and playoffs

International

References

External links

1998 births
Living people
Sportspeople from Most (city)
HC Litvínov players
Manitoba Moose players
HC Most players
Red Deer Rebels players
Undrafted National Hockey League players
Winnipeg Jets players
Czech expatriate ice hockey players in Canada